Pseudorupilia is a genus of swollen restio beetles in the family Chrysomelidae. There are about nine described species in Pseudorupilia. They are found in sub-Saharan Africa.

Species
These nine species belong to the genus Pseudorupilia:
 Pseudorupilia bicostata (Allard, 1889)
 Pseudorupilia careo Grobbelaar, 1995
 Pseudorupilia chera Grobbelaar, 1995
 Pseudorupilia grobbelaarae Beenen, 2016
 Pseudorupilia inconspicua (Jacoby, 1906)
 Pseudorupilia ruficollis (Fabricius, 1775)
 Pseudorupilia sepia Grobbelaar, 1995
 Pseudorupilia sexlineata (Fabricius, 1781) (six-lined leaf beetle)
 Pseudorupilia sola Grobbelaar, 1995

References

Galerucinae
Beetles of Africa
Taxa named by Martin Jacoby
Chrysomelidae genera